Redhills are a Gaelic football club from Redhills, County Cavan in Ireland.  They are affiliated to Cavan GAA.

History

Football was first organised in 1888 in Redhills under the name Annagh sons of Usna.

Kit
Redhills jersey is mainly yellow with blue trim, blue shorts with yellow trim and blue socks with yellow trim.

Honours
 Cavan Intermediate Football Championship: 2
 1973, 2008
 Cavan Junior Football Championship: 1
 2005

See also
Cavan Senior Football Championship

References

External links
Official Cavan GAA Website
Cavan Club GAA
Official Redhills GAA Website

Gaelic games clubs in County Cavan
Gaelic football clubs in County Cavan